Netherlands selected their Junior Eurovision entry for 2010 through Junior Songfestival, a national selection consisting of 8 songs. The winners were Anna & Senna, with the song "My Family".

In Minsk, the song placed 9th, in a field of 14 songs, with 51 points.

Before Junior Eurovision

Junior Songfestival 2010 
The songs were split into two semi finals. From each semi final two sentries qualified for the final based on the decision of adult and children juries as well as televoting. The fifth entry in the final was chosen by online voting (web wildcard).

Semi-final 1

Semi-final 2

Final

At Junior Eurovision

Voting

Notes

References 

Junior Eurovision Song Contest
Netherlands
2010